This is a survey of the postage stamps and postal history of Croatia.

Austria-Hungary
Prior to 1918, Croatia, including Slavonia, was part of the Austro-Hungarian Empire, and beginning in 1850 with the introduction of postage stamps, the stamps of the empire were used. In 1871, after the Croatian–Hungarian Settlement, the new stamps of the Kingdom of Hungary were used, except in Dalmatia which continued to use Austrian stamps.

Kingdom in 1918
In 1918, as part of the State of Slovenes, Croats and Serbs (SHS), Croatia overprinted the existing stocks of Hungarian stamps, with "Hrvatska SHS". In 1919 they printed their own stamps with "Hrvatska" (Croatia) as the country name, some of which also included an "SHS". 

These were used until 1921, when the Kingdom of Serbs, Croats and Slovenes, later the Kingdom of Yugoslavia, began issuing stamps for use throughout the kingdom.

World War II
With the establishment of the Independent State of Croatia (NDH) in 1941, the new government first overprinted existing stocks of Yugoslav stamps with "Nezavisna Drzava Hrvatska", and then issued its own stamps that same year.

Post war
With the fall of the NDH government in 1945, stamps of the Independent State of Croatia were overprinted with a star and "Jugoslavia" or a star and "Demokratska Federativna", but were soon replaced by the stamps of the federal republic of Yugoslavia, beginning with the Marshal Tito stamps of 1945.

Independence
With the resumption of independence in 1991, the Republic of Croatia again reinstated the Croatian Post, with the first new postage stamp being an airmail issued 9 September 1991, and with the first new regular postage stamp being issued on 21 November 1991. However, on 1 April 1991 Croatia had issued a postal tax stamp, required on all mail during the month of April 1991, with the tax payable to the State's Worker’s Fund. The stamp was affixed alongside the regular Yugoslav postage stamps which paid the transmittal fees.

Croatia joined the Universal Postal Union on 20 July 1992, and was an initial participating country in the WADP Numbering System.

Serbian Krajina
Serbian Krajina was a self-proclaimed Serb state within Croatia during the Croatian War of Independence which issued its own stamps. Serbian Krajina was disbanded in 1995 and the eastern part placed under UNTAES administration until reintegration into Croatia in 1998.

Fiume (Rijeka)

In 1918 with the breakup of the Austro-Hungarian Empire, Rijeka was disputed between Italy and the Kingdom of the Serbs, Croats and Slovenes.  For a very short time, overprinted Hungarian stamps were used, but in 1919 Italian irredentists established the Italian Regency of Carnaro which issued its own stamps. These were replaced by the stamps of the Free State of Fiume. On 21 March 1924, following the Treaty of Rome between Italy and Yugoslavia, the two countries agreed to partition  the territory.

Dalmatia

Before World War I, the stamps of Austria were used in Dalmatia. Some parts of Dalmatia were occupied by Italy during World War I, and used Italian stamps. In 1919 Italy printed special stamps for these Dalmatian territories. In 1920, this occupation was confirmed by the Treaty of Rapallo, including the annexation of Zadar to Italy.  Following which Italian stamps were used. After the 1943 surrender of Italy to the Allies in World War II these former Italian parts of Dalmatia were occupied by German troops and Italian stamps were overprinted by German authorities for use. After troops under Marshal Tito took these areas, the stamps of Yugoslavia were used.

See also
Postage stamps and postal history of Yugoslavia
Chimson Collection
List of people on stamps of Croatia

Notes

Further reading
 Barling, Geoff. The Postal Rates of Croatia and Srem. Rochester, Kent: Geoff Barling, 1999
 Rommerskirchen, Helmut. Erganzungen zum Handbuch der Briefmarkenkunde; Heft 47. Kroatien 1941-1945. Cologne: Arbeitsgemeinschaft Jugoslawien im BDPh, 1985, 69p.
 Rommerskirchen, Helmut. Manual of Independent State of Croatia Issues 1941-1945 - Nezavisna Drzava Hrvatska. Borger, TX.: Croatian Philatelic Society, 1986, 107p.
 Vilfan, Mladen. Privremena izdanja Hrvatske i Bosne i Hercegovine 1945 = Provisional issues, Croatia and Bosnia and Herzegovina 1945. Zagreb: OBOL-NAKLADA, 2006 , 224p.

External links

The Chronology of Postal Authorities Issuing Stamps in Croatia and Bosnia-Herzegovina.
 

Philately of Croatia